Women's Professional Soccer (WPS) was the top-level professional women's soccer league in the United States. It began play on March 29, 2009. The league was composed of seven teams for its first two seasons and fielded six teams for the 2011 season, with continued plans for future expansion. The WPS was the highest level in the United States soccer pyramid for the women's game.

On January 30, 2012, the league announced suspension of the 2012 season, citing several internal organization struggles as the primary cause. Some of these issues included an ongoing legal battle with magicJack owner Dan Borislow and the lack of resources invested into the league. On May 18, 2012, WPS announced the league folded and would not return in 2013. After the WPS folded, the National Women's Soccer League formed in 2013 and took WPS's place as the top professional women's soccer league.

History

Planning 

After the folding of Women's United Soccer Association, which played its third and final full season in 2003, WUSA Reorganization Committee was formed in September of that year. The committee led to the founding in November 2004 of the non-profit organization, Women's Soccer Initiative, Inc. (WSII), whose stated goal was "promoting and supporting all aspects of women's soccer in the United States", including the founding of a new professional league.  Attempts to relaunch WUSA in full fell through in 2004 (when the league's member teams played in two WUSA Festivals instead) and 2005.
In June 2006, WSII announced the relaunch of the league for the 2008 season.

In December 2006, the organization announced that it reached an agreement with six owner-operators for teams based in Chicago, Dallas, Los Angeles, St. Louis, Washington, DC, and a then-unnamed city.  Later, Boston and New York/New Jersey were announced as other markets to have teams. In September 2007, the launch was pushed back from Spring of 2008 to 2009 to avoid clashing with 2007 Women's World Cup and the 2008 Olympic Games and to ensure that all of the teams were fully prepared for long-term operations.

On May 27, 2008, the league announced that it would expand to Philadelphia for the 2010 season, with the franchise likely sharing facilities with MLS's Philadelphia Union.  Despite being the eighth named team, the league still considered adding an eighth team to play in the league's inaugural season. An eighth team for the inaugural season was tentatively announced as being located in San Diego, and was finalized later. Still, despite the extra time given to the original five cities for preparations, the Dallas franchise did not materialize, citing stadium issues.  Thus the league began with seven teams.

The new name of the league, Women's Professional Soccer, was announced on January 17, 2008, along with the logo, which featured the silhouette of retired player Mia Hamm.

Building the league

Player allocation 

Player allocation began on September 16, 2008, after the Beijing Olympics in August, when WPS announced the allocation of 21 US national team players, three players to each of the seven teams that began play in the 2009 season.  Most players were matched with teams they had some previous connection to, such as hometown, college, WUSA, or W-League affiliation. All of the allocated Americans played in the 2009 season except for Kate Markgraf, who was pregnant at the start of the season.  A week later, the league held the 2008 WPS International Draft, in which the seven teams selected four international players each.  Four of the first five selections, first pick Formiga (Bay Area), Marta (#3, Los Angeles), Daniela (#4, St. Louis), and Cristiane (#5, Chicago) were Brazilian, and a total of 10 Brazilian players were selected. England's Kelly Smith (#2, Boston) and Japan's Homare Sawa (#6, Washington), and Australia's Sarah Walsh rounded out the first round. The draft order was based on a weighted ranking determined by a vote of league coaches following the U.S. women's national team allocation.  A general draft was held in October, followed by a combine for college seniors and undrafted players in December, a post-combine draft in January, and local tryouts by individual teams in February.

Inaugural season

Before the season began, WPS was only able to secure two sponsors, and most teams did not advertise much or get their rosters finalized until late in the preseason.  During the season, though, WPS secured several more sponsors, and WPS announced the expansion to Atlanta as the ninth team for next season.

WPS's inaugural game was played to a crowd of over 14,000 fans at the Home Depot Center as the hosts Los Angeles Sol beat the Washington Freedom 2–0.  The first season saw several issues occur, including an uneven schedule due to the odd number of teams (that the Sol took advantage of as they won the inaugural season), several season-ending injuries, two major trades, decisions from the WPS disciplinary committee and commissioner, and a Cinderella-run to the championship title (won by Sky Blue FC).  Most teams considered the first season a moderate success, despite many losing more money than planned.

Growing pains
This success/optimism did not extend to the Sol, though, as after AEG failed to sell the team it was announced that the Sol would be disbanding.  As AEG had given the Sol back to the league, a dispersal draft was held to distribute the players to the remaining eight teams.  This was not the case when the Saint Louis Athletica suddenly and unexpectedly ran into financial problems and folded mid-May.  The league schedule had to be re-done, and all of Athletica's players became free agents.  Most were signed by the Atlanta Beat, who had only earned one point until then and ultimately finished the season at the bottom of the table.

The other expansion franchise, the Philadelphia Independence fared much better, finishing third on the season and ultimately losing the WPS Final to the incredibly dominant FC Gold Pride.  Around the same time, WPS announced the addition of a western New York franchise for the 2011 season, spawning from the existing Buffalo Flash organization.  Despite these strong showings, overall attendance for 2010 was noticeably down from 2009, and one team (the Washington Freedom) made public mid-season that it was looking for new investors.  Also, at the championship game, commissioner Tonya Antonucci announced she would step down, with Anne-Marie Eileraas taking leadership as the new WPS CEO.

More problems came to light early in the offseason.  Four teams – FC Gold Pride, the Chicago Red Stars, the Boston Breakers, and Washington – all missed the payment deadline for a large up-front escrow meant to prevent what happened to St. Louis from happening again.  Ultimately, the Gold Pride could not find the necessary money and folded.  Chicago was given a 30-day extension but announced in December that they would not play in WPS in 2011, opting to regroup in the second-tier Women's Premier Soccer League.  Washington and Boston ultimately were able to make their payments, leaving six teams for the 2011 season.

National exposure
The beginning of the league's third season was marked by three overshadowing challenges: low attendance, problems with (ex-Freedom) magicJack owner Dan Borislow, and an FC Gold Pride-like dominance by the Western New York Flash.  While national team players were away at the 2011 FIFA Women's World Cup, though, the Independence started an incredible streak that saw them temporarily overtake the Flash at the top of the table.

The success of the United States women's national soccer team at the 2011 FIFA Women's World Cup resulted in an upsurge in attendance league-wide and helped set a new all-time league attendance record for a single game at 15,504 during a match between the Western New York Flash and magicJack in Abby Wambach's hometown of Rochester, New York on July 20, 2011. A new attendance record for a WPS final was also set just a few weeks later at Sahlen's Stadium again in Rochester when 10,461 fans filled the stadium on August 27, 2011 for the championship game between the Flash and the Philadelphia Independence.  The final was also the closest-contested in the league's short history, with both teams scoring and ultimately going into penalty kicks, where the Flash bested the Independence 5–4 with a last-round save made by Ashlyn Harris.

The national exposure to women's soccer, and the upswing in attendance, sparked other groups interested in bringing teams to the WPS.  The league had hoped to have ten teams for the 2012 season, with most of the new groups potentially coming from the western half of the country, but ultimately no ownership groups were ready to join in time and instead aimed for the 2013 season.  On November 20, 2011, the United States Soccer Federation gave WPS 15 days to field a sixth team, in order for the league to maintain its Division 1 status, after magicJack was terminated by the league. magicJack would later be reinstated as an exhibition team, slated to play seven games each for the next two seasons against WPS teams.

The league had sought an extension of the league size waiver through the 2012 season, which would include the 2012 Summer Olympics, in hope of attracting more sponsors for the 2013 season.  USSF granted sanctioning, with conditions requiring expansion, through 2014.

Folding
On January 30, 2012, the league announced suspension of the 2012 season, citing several internal organization struggles as the primary cause. Some of these included an ongoing legal battle with ex-franchise owner Dan Borislow, and the lack of resources invested into the league.

Prior to the formal announcement, the USSF showed reservation about renewing sanctioning for WPS, citing the sparsity and geographic concentration of WPS team as the main problem.  (USSF requires professional, top-division leagues to have at least eight teams over at least three time zones.)  Ultimately, USSF granted WPS a waiver on this issue for the third time in WPS's history, on the conditions that WPS expands to six teams by 2013 and eight by 2014.

On May 18, 2012 the WPS announced that the league had officially ceased operations. Its remaining teams were assimilated into the WPSL Elite League.

Organization

Business model 

WPS commissioner Tonya Antonucci said that unlike WUSA, which had higher expectations and employed a top-down model, WPS would take "a local, grass roots approach", and "a slow and steady growth type of approach", citing WUSA's losses of close to $100 million. She said the new league would have a closer relationship with Major League Soccer, the top men's professional league in the United States, to cut costs on staff and facilities, and for marketing.

The team budgets for the inaugural season was $2.5 million.

WPS Players Union
WPS players were represented by the Women's Professional Soccer Players Union (WPSPU), an independent, democratic labor organization run by and for the players.  The WPSPU was certified and recognized by the league on September 8, 2010 in Washington, DC.  Jennifer Hitchon served as Executive Director and Robert H. Stropp of Mooney, Green, Baker & Saindon, PC, was General Counsel. The players who made up the 2011–2012 WPSPU Executive Committee were: Eniola Aluko, Rachel Buehler, Allison Falk, Leslie Osborne, Christie Rampone, Becky Sauerbrunn, Cat Whitehill, and Kristine Lilly (member emeritus). These players were responsible for advising the Executive Director, setting union priorities, approving union bargaining positions and proposals, and responding to WPS counter-proposals, among other activities.

Media coverage

Fox Soccer Channel and Fox Sports en Español with Samuel Jacobo and Jorge Caamaño aired weekly Sunday night matches and the WPS All-Star Game. Fox Sports Net aired the semifinal and league championship contests. The national television contract was in effect through the 2011 season with an option for 2012. Some local networks aired games.

Teams

^- Team was originally named the Washington Freedom

Attendance

Commissioners and CEOs

Awards
WPS handed out seven end-of-year awards. Six of them dated to the league's formation, while the Rookie of the Year award was added in 2010.

 Michelle Akers Player of the Year Award
 WPS Coach of the Year Award
 WPS Defender of the Year Award
 WPS Goalkeeper of the Year Award
 WPS Rookie of the Year Award
 WPS Golden Boot
 WPS Sportswoman of the Year

See also

 List of Women's Professional Soccer stadiums
 List of WPS drafts
 List of non-American WPS players
 Women's United Soccer Association
 National Women's Soccer League
 United States women's national soccer team
 National Soccer Hall of Fame
 List of professional sports teams in the United States and Canada
 Women's professional sports
 Women's sports

References

External links

  (via archive.org)

 
2007 establishments in the United States
1
Defunct professional sports leagues in the United States
Summer association football leagues
2012 disestablishments in the United States
Sports leagues established in 2007
Sports leagues disestablished in 2012